Schmalzl is a surname. Notable people with the surname include:

Eberardo Schmalzl (born 1950), Italian alpine skier
Helmuth Schmalzl (born 1948), Italian alpine skier
Max Schmalzl (1850–1930), German redemptorist, engraver, and painter 

German-language surnames